The Dun Ailline Druid Brotherhood (also known as Dun Ailline or HDDA, Hermandad Druida Dun Ailline in Spanish) is a pagan organization for followers of the Celtic Neopaganism based on Spain in 2010, which supports the practice of a type of Celtic Reconstructionist Paganism called Druidism, centered on the Celtic culture of Ireland, and whose principal deities are known as the Tuatha Dé Danann. Its members consider themselves practitioners of a European native religion and they call themselves creidim, a concept of Irish origin.

In Spain, the Dun Ailline Druidic Brotherhood is legally registered under the number and Irish name 2854-SG/A – Traidisiún na Beannach Fia Mór – Irish Reconstructionist Druid Tradition, being one of the first neopagan religions legally recognized in Spain, traditionally a Catholic country, with other organizations like the Fintan Druidic Order and the Celtiberic Wicca, among others.

Druidism 

The first revival of Druidism came from the hand of John Aubrey and John Toland. The September 21, 1716, day of the autumn equinox, the Druidic group of which John Toland was one of the members, was commissioned to proclaim symbolically at the top of Primrose Hill, and "facing the eye of light" (the sun), the call, for all Druids that may exist around the world, the assembly that was to take place on September 22, 1717 in London in the Apple Tree Tavern, Charles st., Coven garden. At the same time calls were sent by messengers to the various 'Bosquets or Groves' that were known to still exist. The delegates of the Druidic bardic circles and represented at the meeting of September 22, 1717 came from bosquets, groves or circles so far as London, York, Oxford, Wales, Cornwall, the Isle of Man, Anglesey, Scotland, Ireland and Armorica in France, especially of the town of Nantes.

Subsequently, because of the Irish diaspora, a new nativist Druidic line, centered on the reconstructionism of the culture, spirituality and folklore of Ireland arises in United States. The creidim honor the deities known as Tuatha Dé Danann, headed by An Dagda and oldest Celtic deities like Cernunnos. The word creidim means believer in Gaeilge.

History 
After the disappearance of the Ord Draiochta Na Uisnech - ODU, Order made by Kenn R. White, in 2009 closes the Grove Magh Mor, "grove" in Spain that ODU dedicated to promoting the Tradition of the Great Stag. In 2010 Marta Vey founded the Dun Ailline Druid Brotherhood, in order to preserve and transmit the Tradition of the Great Stag. In the same year, 2010, a cultural association focused on the recreationism of Ireland in the 6th-9th centuries, whose purpose is to publicize their culture, customs and myths, was created.

In October 2012, HDDA becomes recognized as a religious denomination by the Government of Spain.

In November 2012 was admitted as a full member of the Spanish Platform for Religious Freedom of Paganism, created with the purpose of obtaining legal rights to practitioners of pagan beliefs and serve as interlocutor with the Government of Spain.

In December 2014, the HDDA participates in the II Pagan Day held in L'Hospitalet de Llobregat, (Barcelona).

Structural organization 

The organization is headed by the Ard droi / Ard Bandrui who legally represents the religious association, being also the religious leader of it.

HDDA base is formed by creidim. The priesthood is made by droi and Bandrui. Any creidim can access the priestly preparation if you meet the requirements.

In 2014, the founder Marta Vey was named Ard Bandrui by the priestly assembly, and was ratified as legal and religious representative of HDDA.

The creidim  are organized into local groups that meet for holding various celebrations.

Festivities 
 Seasonal Celebrations
 Samhain, Mean Geimhridh, Imbolc, Ostara, Beltane, Mean Samhraidh (see also Litha), Lughnassadh and the autumn Equinox, called Mean Foghamar (see also Mabon).
 Gui and Devotions
 Intraseasonal celebrations

Beliefs 
The Four Pillars of Druidism and the Six Celtic Virtues, ethical code that suggest the behavior patterns of the creidim.

Sacred texts 

 The Mythological Cycle (The Lebor Gabála Érenn, The First and Second battle of Cath Maige Tuired, Togail Bruidne Dá Derga,...)
 The Ulster Cycle or Rúraíocht (Táin Bó Cúailnge, Lebor na hUidre...)
 The Fenian Cycle, also known as Fiannaidheacht.
 The Cycles of the Kings, (Immram), the travels to Tír na nÓg, among other tales and legends.
 Other texts are the (Brehon Laws, Carmina Gadelica by Alexander Carmichael, the Druidic Triads...)

See also
 Celtic neopaganism
 Celtic Reconstructionist Paganism
 Dún Ailinne, ancient ceremonial site on the hill of Cnoc Ailinne (Knockaulin) in County Kildare, Ireland
 Neopaganism in Latin Europe
 Minor religions in Spain
 Neo-Druidism

Notes

References 
 Observatory of Religious Pluralism in Spain Fundación Pluralismo y Convivencia, Icaria editorial.  (Spanish)

External links
 Official Website of the Dun Ailline Druid Brotherhood (HDDA)

Modern pagan organisations based in Spain
Neo-druidism
Religious organizations established in 2010
2010 establishments in Spain
Modern pagan organizations established in the 2010s